Byagawat also spelled as Byagavat or Byagwat is a village in the Manvi taluk of Raichur district in the Indian state of Karnataka. Byagawat is located northwest to Manvi. Byagawat lies on the road connecting Manvi and  Kavital. Great saint Sri Jagannatha Dasa lived in Byagawat.

Demographics
As of the 2001 India census, Byagawat had a population of 6,185, with 3,080 males, 3,105 females and 1,156 households.

See also

Kalmala
Devadurga
Lingasugur
Sindhanur
Raichur
Districts of Karnataka

References

External links
 www.raichur.nic.in

Villages in Raichur district